Jacob J. Shubert (c. 1879 – December 26, 1963) was an American theatre owner/operator and producer and a member of the famous theatrical Shubert family.

Biography
Born in Vladislavov, in  the Suwałki Governorate of Congress Poland, a part of the Russian Empire (present-day Kudirkos Naumiestis, Lithuania), (according to his obituary, he was born in Syracuse) he was the sixth child and third son of Duvvid Schubart and Katrina Helwitz, a Jewish couple. Jacob was still a small child when the family emigrated in 1881 to the United States, settling in Syracuse, New York where a number of Jewish families from their hometown  were already living.

His father's alcoholism kept the family in difficult financial circumstances and both he and his older brothers received little in the way of education and had no choice but to go to work at a young age. With borrowed money, he and brothers Sam and Lee Shubert eventually embarked on a business venture that led to them becoming the successful operators of several theatre houses in upstate New York.

The Shubert brothers decided to expand their theatrical operations and in 1900 Sam and Lee Shubert moved to New York City leaving Jacob at home to manage their existing theatres. In New York, the elder Shuberts laid the foundations for what was to become the largest theatre empire in the 20th century including Broadway's Winter Garden and Shubert Theatres.  In 1905 Sam Shubert was traveling to Pittsburgh, Pennsylvania on business when the passenger train he was on collided with several freight cars.  Shubert died as a result of the injuries he sustained.  His death changed the brothers' business dynamics and Jacob assumed a much larger role.

Together, although often feuding, Jacob and Lee Shubert overcame the stranglehold on the industry by the Theatrical Syndicate's monopoly under Abe Erlanger and Mark Klaw to build the largest theatre empire in the 20th century.

Jacob Shubert's son, John, took over as head of the operations in the 1950s but died unexpectedly on November 17, 1962 and a year later, Jacob died around age 84. Jacob apparently was not made aware of his son's death. He was divorced from his wife, Katherine, in 1917, but was married to Muriel at the time of his death.  He was interred in the family plot in the Salem Fields Cemetery in Brooklyn, New York.

He left a substantial portion of his assets to the Shubert Foundation, and by 1972, the assets of his estate totalled $60 million.

References

Further reading
 Jonas Westover (2017).  The Shuberts and Their Passing Shows: The Untold Tale of Ziegfeld's Rivals, Oxford University Press

External links 

 
"Who's Who in Musicals", John Kenrick, musicals101.com
  Shubert Organization
  Shubert Foundation biography

1870s births
1963 deaths
People from Kudirkos Naumiestis
People from Suwałki Governorate
Lithuanian Jews
Emigrants from the Russian Empire to the United States
American people of Lithuanian-Jewish descent
American theatre managers and producers
Businesspeople from New York City
Businesspeople from Syracuse, New York
Shubert Organization
Burials at Salem Fields Cemetery